The 2022 Newfoundland and Labrador Tankard, the men's provincial curling championship for Newfoundland and Labrador, was held from February 8 to 13 at the RE/MAX Centre in St. John's, Newfoundland and Labrador. The winning Nathan Young team represented Newfoundland and Labrador at the 2022 Tim Hortons Brier, Canada's national men's curling championship in Lethbridge, Alberta.

Teams
The teams are listed as follows:

Round-robin standings
Final round-robin standings

Round-robin results
All draws are listed in Newfoundland Time (UTC−03:30).

Draw 1
Tuesday, February 8, 1:30 pm

Draw 2
Tuesday, February 8, 7:30 pm

Draw 3
Wednesday, February 9, 1:30 pm

Draw 4
Wednesday, February 9, 7:30 pm

Draw 5
Thursday, February 10, 1:30 pm

Draw 6
Thursday, February 10, 7:30 pm

Draw 7
Friday, February 11, 1:30 pm

Draw 8
Friday, February 11, 7:30 pm

Draw 9
Saturday, February 12, 9:00 am

Playoffs

Semifinal
Saturday, February 12, 3:00 pm

Final
Sunday, February 13, 1:00 pm

References

External links

2022 Tim Hortons Brier
Tankard, 2022
Tankard, 2022
Tankard, 2022
February 2022 sports events in Canada